François Zdenek Eberl  (May 25, 1887 - October 8, 1962) was an Austro-Hungarian Empire-born painter who worked mainly in Paris, France. At his prime, his name was included among those of fellow painters and personal friends Pablo Picasso, Amedeo Modigliani and Maurice de Vlaminck.

Early life and education 
Frantisek Zdenek Maurice Augustin Eberl was born on May 25, 1887, in Prague into an upper-middle-class family. His parents were both Catholics with Swedish and French ancestry.

Eberl's artistic talent became obvious early on: in 1903 he was admitted to the local Academy of Fine Arts where he and fellow painter Emil Filla studied under Vlaho Buhovac. His artistic temperament, however, was incompatible with the Academy’s conservative tradition resulting in his leaving Prague and travelling Europe.

 In October 1904 Eberl arrived in Munich and enrolled in the local Academy of Fine Arts. He received excellent reviews by his teachers, among them artist Franz von Stuck. Soon, Eberl became a teacher at the Academy himself; however, negative response to his publication of a few political drawings critical of Bavarian nobility caused Eberl to leave Germany. In 1911, Eberl settled down in the artists’ quarter of Montmartre and began showing his works in the famous Paris salons of the time.

Career and private life

World War I 
During World War I, Eberl used his talent at caricature drawing and supplied artworks for posters, flyers and sketches to a Czech organization fighting the Austro-Hungarian Empire. In 1914 he joined the Czech legion and fought alongside the Allies. After a year and a half on the battlefield he suffered a serious injury and was honorably discharged. He joined the Red Cross in La Somme. Despite the war raging in Europe Eberl’s works were seen in numerous exhibits to a growing audience of art lovers.

During the war Eberl married Frida Dohring, a Danish woman. They returned to Monmartre where Eberl gained the friendship and patronage of writers Francis Carco, Pierre Mac Orlan and Roland Dorgelès. He counted among his friends fellow painters Pablo Picasso, Amedeo Modigliani and Maurice de Vlaminck.

Between the wars 
By 1920 Eberl francofied his name and became François Maurice Eberl. His career took off in that decade. He enjoyed several single artist exhibits, the legendary art dealer Berthe Weill took an interest and included him in numerous exhibits in her Parisian gallery, and Eberl became a member of the Salon des Artistes Independents. As an independent agent he arranged art exhibits within and outside France both for himself and other Salon members.

The exuberance of the period was on full display in Eberl’s private life. He drove racecars for Bugatti, owned a menagerie that including both lion and crocodile, and with his wife enjoyed the bohemian artist’s life that characterizes Paris of that time. In 1928 Francois Eberl was awarded the Legion of Honor by the French government. From 1930 until the end of his life Eberl spent summers in the Monaco and he considered it his second home.

World War II & after 
During World War II in the early 1940s Eberl’s wife Frida died of a heart condition. Eberl joined the French Resistance and at great personal risk created political caricatures for the Resistance that were air dropped over occupied areas to mobilize people. He also participated in helping Jews threatened with deportation to escape to Spain. After the war, Eberl returned to his Parisian workshop in Rue Camille Tahan.

In the late 1940s Eberl married for the second time: Béatrice Seidl brought with her her nephew, Marc-Fréderic, and Eberl became a stepfather. With his new family Eberl entered a quieter time. Together they returned to Eberl’s pre-war practice of spending summers in Monaco where Eberl was made an honorary citizen after the war. Eberl resumed active involvement in Monaco’s cultural life. He helped arrange art exhibits with important artists.

Death 
On October 8, 1962 Eberl, died of cancer in his Paris studio. He is buried in Viliers-le-Bel, near Paris.

Style and themes 
Although well known for his sensual nudes, it was the first and foremost his authentic depiction of Monmartre’s gritty nightlife atmosphere with its prostitutes, gamblers, drug addicts and alcoholics that promoted Eberl´s fame.

Drawing inspiration from the folklore of Paris, his preference was to paint the street scenes and nightclubs as he observed them. Eberl was interested in capturing the marginalized lives of the poor in the shadows of glittering Paris. Eberl came from a well-off family and enjoyed financial freedom and success all his life. Despite his position in life he would mingle and be welcome with the so-called ‘lower classes’ that allowed him to paint them.

Eberl never compromised his subjects but rather he expressed their full humanity in his paintings. This distinguishes him among the painters of his time. Eberl’s Monmartre paintings are the embodiment of a social environment in a given time – the evocation of Bohemian Paris, a mythical place in time when even the streets had a certain grandeur and romantic spirit. Also, Eberl had a distinctive color palette which made generous use of earthy tones of browns and reds.

Works on display 

Eberl's works were regularly on display at gallery of Berthe Weill as well as the gallery Bernheim-Jeune and Devambez. Eberl was also a member of the Salon des Indépendants and the Salon d'Automne. 

Works by Eberl are currently at display at the Musée Monaco, the Musée des Beaux Arts, the Fonds municipal d´art contemporain der Stadt Paris and the Musées d'art moderne de Saint-Etienne. The Musée du Montparnasse has displayed several works by Eberl in the past, the last time in 2002.

References 

1887 births
1962 deaths
Czech painters
Czech male painters
Artists from Prague
Austro-Hungarian emigrants to France